The Philadelphia KiXX was a professional indoor soccer team based in Philadelphia, USA. The team competed as an NPSL expansion franchise and then played in the Major Indoor Soccer League.

History
The team's original owner was Ed Tepper, also president of Tepper Properties Inc, had been one of the co-founders of the original MISL. In 2001, the KiXX along with five other NPSL franchises founded the new Major Indoor Soccer League.  They were originally sponsored by Oki Data Americas.  The KiXX won the first MISL championship (2001–02 season) over the Milwaukee Wave 2 games to 1 (4–11, 11–4, 8–6) in the best of three game championship series. The KiXX also won the 2006–07 MISL championship defeating the Detroit Ignition 13–8 in a one-game championship.  After the MISL folded in 2008, the KiXX announced that they had joined the National Indoor Soccer League for its inaugural season in 2008–09.  The NISL took on the MISL moniker for its second season.

On March 2, 2010, KiXX goalkeeper Peter Pappas retired after playing his final match against the Baltimore Blast at the Liacouras Center. In honor of his years of dedication and spotless record the KiXX decided to retire the #22 jersey. Pappas spent 13 seasons with the KiXX. During that time he played in 416 matches, recording 5,399 saves and 230 wins. He was named Major Indoor Soccer League (MISL) ‘Goalkeeper of the Year’ four times and an All-League selection eight times. Fellow long-term KiXX member Don D'Ambra also retired in 2010.  He served as head coach of the KiXX from 2002 to 2010 and played 575 games, scoring 483 goals.  In April 2010, D'Ambra was named the head coach of the Saint Joseph's Hawks men's soccer team.

The team went on hiatus after the conclusion of the 2009–10 season and did not return to play before the MISL folded as a league in 2014.

The KiXX: Reborn
On May 20, 2021, a charter franchise in the new Arena Soccer League was announced and named in honor of the original team for the spring 2023 season.

Year-by-year

Head coaches

Arenas
 Wachovia Spectrum 1996–2009
Liacouras Center 2009–2010

 Between 1996 and 2009 the team has also played select games at the Wachovia Center, Gaylord Entertainment Center in Nashville, Tennessee, and at the Sovereign Bank Arena in Trenton, New Jersey.

References

External links
 Official website
 http://www.misl.net/news/?article_id=248

Soccer clubs in Pennsylvania
1995 establishments in Pennsylvania
2010 disestablishments in Pennsylvania
Indoor soccer clubs in the United States
Major Indoor Soccer League (2001–2008) teams
Major Indoor Soccer League (2008–2014) teams
National Professional Soccer League (1984–2001) teams
Association football clubs established in 1995
K